Portrait of a Young Man in Red is a 1485-1490 oil on panel portrait by Giovanni Bellini, now in the National Gallery of Art in Washington. He had been making portraits since 1474 and this is held to be one of his best in the genre, though its subject is unknown. It may have been in Andrea Vendramin's collection in Venice in 1627. It passed to count Manfredi von Ingenheim and was handed down to his heirs until 1930, when it was sold. Andrew W. Mellon then acquired it and it passed to the National Gallery of Art with the rest of his collection in 1937.

References

Young Man in Red
Collections of the National Gallery of Art
Young Man in Red
1490 paintings